Noel Luces (23 December 1948 – 13 March 2012) was a Trinidadian cyclist. He competed  at the 1968 Summer Olympics.

References

1948 births
2012 deaths
Trinidad and Tobago male cyclists
Olympic cyclists of Trinidad and Tobago
Cyclists at the 1968 Summer Olympics
Commonwealth Games competitors for Trinidad and Tobago
Cyclists at the 1974 British Commonwealth Games
20th-century Trinidad and Tobago people